Clara Adriana van der Werff (1895-1962) was a Dutch artist.

Biography 
van der Werff was born on 12 August 1895 in Almelo. She attended the Rijksakademie van beeldende kunsten (State Academy of Fine Arts). Her teachers included Johannes Hendricus Jurres and Nicolaas van der Waay. In 1923 she married the Dutch sculptor  (1896-1967). Her work was included in the 1939 exhibition and sale Onze Kunst van Heden (Our Art of Today) at the Rijksmuseum in Amsterdam.  She was a member of the Vereniging van Beeldende Kunstenaars (Association of Visual Artists) in the area of Naarden-Bussum.

van der Werff died on 13 September 1962 in Bussum.

References

1895 births
1962 deaths
People from Almelo
20th-century Dutch women artists